Elias Leo Milonas (born October 23, 1936) is an American lawyer who served for 26 years as a judge in New York State. He is now a partner with the law firm Pillsbury Winthrop.

Education

Milonas graduated from Brooklyn Law School with an L.L.B. in 1960.

Career

Milonas served as an associate justice for the Appellate Division of the Supreme Court, First Judicial Department from 1982 to 1998; he was Chief Administrative Judge of the State of New York from 1993 to 1995, Deputy Chief Administrative Judge for New York City Courts from 1979 to 1981, and he served as state Supreme Court justice from 1978 to 1979. Prior to that, Milonas served as an Acting Supreme Court Justice, and Supervising Judge for New York County Criminal Court and the Bronx Criminal Court.

He is currently a partner at the law firm Pillsbury Winthrop, where he specializes in complex commercial litigation, appeals, and alternative dispute resolution. His clients have included General Electric, Viacom, Pfizer, Schering-Plough, Deutsche Bank, Bank of New York, American Express, and The Bank of Cyprus.

Civic involvement

Milonas has taken an active role in numerous civic and governmental institutions. From 2002 to 2004 he served as president of the New York City Bar Association. He has also served as a fellow of the American Bar Association; Director of the Legal Aid Society; Director of the Fund for Modern Courts; board member of the New York Urban League; and board member for the Fund for the City of New York, among other offices.

On February 6, 2019, the New York Commission on Judicial Nomination elected Milonas to be its chair, succeeding Alan Mansfield, who had served that role in an interim capacity since the death of Judith Kaye in 2016.

References

Sources
 Pillsbury Winthrop Biography
 Appellate Division Biography
 “E. Leo Milonas Joins National Board of State Courts.” National Board of State Courts. Press Release. October 15, 2003.

Living people
New York (state) state court judges
Brooklyn Law School alumni
1936 births
Presidents of the New York City Bar Association
People associated with Pillsbury Winthrop Shaw Pittman